"My Champion" is a song written and performed by Alter Bridge, released as the second single from the band's fifth album, The Last Hero.

Personnel
Alter Bridge
 Myles Kennedy – lead and backing vocals, rhythm and lead guitar
 Mark Tremonti – lead guitar
 Brian Marshall – bass
 Scott Phillips – drums

Production
 Michael "Elvis" Baskette – production
 Ted Jensen – mastering

Chart performance

References

Alter Bridge songs
2016 singles